Martin Iñaki Mateu (born 17 March 1997, Tucumán) is an Argentine-born Spanish rugby union player.
His usual position is as a Centre and he currently plays for Ciencias Sevilla CR.

He played for Italian tema Viadana in Top12, from 2020 to 2022.

In 2016 and 2017 Mateu was named in the Spain Under 20 squad and from 2018 he is part of the Spain Sevens squad to participate at the annualWorld Rugby Sevens Series and the Sevens Grand Prix Series. 
From 2017 to 2018, he was also named in the Spain squad for the World Rugby Nations Cup and Rugby Europe Championship.

References

External links
It's Rugby France Profile
ESPN Profile

Argentine rugby union players
Rugby union centres
Rugby Viadana players
1997 births
Living people
Sportspeople from Tucumán Province
Spain international rugby union players
Argentine emigrants to Spain
Rugby union players from the Community of Madrid
Expatriate rugby union players in Italy
Spanish expatriate sportspeople in Italy
Argentine expatriate sportspeople in Italy
Spanish expatriate rugby union players
Argentine expatriate rugby union players